T28 may refer to:

Aircraft 
 Enstrom T-28, an American helicopter
 North American T-28 Trojan, an American trainer
 Slingsby T.28, a British glider

Armoured land vehicles 
 T-28, a Soviet tank
 T28 Super Heavy Tank, an American experimental self-propelled gun
 T28 Armored Car, an American armored vehicle

Naval vessels 
 
 , a patrol boat of the Royal Navy

Other uses 
 T28 (wrestler) (born 1983), Japanese wrestler
 Abeno Station, in Abeno-ku, Osaka, Japan
 Ericsson T28, a mobile phone
 Takamatsu Station (Kagawa), in Japan

See also
 Type 28 (disambiguation)